

eu
eucatropine (INN)
eufauserase (INN)
Eulexin
Eumovate
eupatilin (INN)
euprocin (INN)
Eurax
Euthroid
Eutonyl
Eutron

ev
evacetrapib (INN)
Evalose
evandamine (INN)
evatanepag (USAN, INN)
everolimus (USAN)
Evex
Evista (Eli Lilly and Company)
Evoxac

ex
exalamide (INN)
exametazime (INN)
examorelin (INN)
exaprolol (INN)
exbivirumab (INN)
Excedrin
Exelderm
Exelon
exemestane (INN)
exenatide (USAN)
exepanol (INN)
Exidine
exifone (INN)
exiproben (INN)
Exna
Exosurf Neonatal
Exsel
Extra-Strength Aim
Extraneal

ez
ezatiostat (USAN, INN)
ezogabine (USAN)